A bishop-bowl (Danish: Bispebolle) is a punch bowl made of faience and shaped in the form of a mitre (a bishop's hat) that was popular in Denmark and Schleswig-Holstein in the eighteenth end nineteenth centuries. The alcoholic drink served from the bowl was known as "bishop".

History
The drink bishop is of German origins and the name refers to the violet colour of a bishop's garments. The popularity of the punch led to the manufacturing of special punch bowls shaped in the form of a bishop's hat or later as a bishop.

The first bishop-bowls in Denmark were produced at Store Kongensgade Faience Manufactury, Denmark's first faience manufacturer, that was founded in Copenhagen in 1722.

The drink
 
The basic ingredients of bishop are red wine, bitter orange and/or common orange (zest and juise)) and suga. Recipees from the second half of the 19th century frequently mention that rum can be added to improve tastate and shelf life. Examples of recipes of bishop can for instance be found in the following cook books:
 Beate Augustine Friedel: Nye og fuldstændige Confectyr-bog eller grundig Underviisning til selv at forfærdige alle muelige Slags Conditorievare; En Haandbog til Brug for Huusmødre, Mands- og Fruentimmer-kokke (New and Complete Confectionery Book). The book is written in German and translated into Danish in  1795.
 Christopher Jacobsen: Nye Kogebog eller Anviisning til at koge, bage, stege, indsylte, henlægge, indslagte, anrette o.s.v. af C. Jacobsen (1815), Jacobsen  was the private cook for count Frederik Ahlefeldt-Laurvig at Tranekær Castle on Langeland.
 Anne Marie Mangor: Kogebog for smaa Huusholdninger indeholdende Anvisning til forskellige Retters og Kagers Tillavning, med nøiagtig angiven Maal og Vægt (1876),

Exhibition
Early bishop-bowl from Store Kongensgade faience Manufactury are for instance on display at The David Collection in Copenhagen and at the Museum of National History at Frederiksborg Castle in Hillerød. Bishop-bowls from a manufacturer in Schleswig can be seen St. Anne's Museum in Lübeck.

Den Gamle By has a bishop-bowl shaped in the form of a seated bishop made in Kellinghusen in Holstein in c. 1770. The figure is 34 cm high and the upper half comes off as a lit.

Depictions
A Danish stamp from 1970 features a drawing of a bishop-bowl. The drawing was created by Claus Achton Friis.

References
''

External links

Danish porcelain
Drinkware
Danish cuisine
Danish culture